The Abduction Club is a 2002 British-Irish romantic comedy-drama adventure film directed by Stefan Schwartz. Based loosely on real events, the plot centres on a group of outlaws who abduct women in order to marry them. It was written by Richard Crawford and Bill Britten.

Plot
In 18th century Ireland, there are two financially insecure young bachelors, Garrett Byrne and James Strang, whose exploits evolve from the need to secure wealth. Both are younger sons that will not inherit titles and estates so they become members of an infamous society known as the 'Abduction Club', whose main aim is to woo and then abduct wealthy heiresses in order to marry them (therefore providing themselves with financial security). The men decide to set their sights on the beautiful yet feisty Kennedy sisters, Catherine and Anne, but are unprepared for the negative reaction they are to receive, and they soon find themselves on the run across the Irish countryside (with the sisters in tow) from Anne's cold-hearted admirer, John Power, who does not take kindly to the news of their kidnapping, and with the help of the embittered Attorney General Lord Fermoy, implicates Byrne and Strang in the murder of a Redcoat soldier.

Cast
Alice Evans as Catherine Kennedy
Daniel Lapaine as Garrett Byrne
Sophia Myles as Anne Kennedy
Matthew Rhys as James Strang
Liam Cunningham as John Power
Edward Woodward as Lord Fermoy
Patrick Malahide as Sir Myles
Tom Murphy as Knox

References

External links

2002 films
2000s adventure comedy-drama films
2002 romantic comedy-drama films
British adventure comedy-drama films
British romantic comedy-drama films
Films about kidnapping
Films about capital punishment
Films about social class
Films set in Ireland
Films set in the 1780s
Romance films based on actual events
Films directed by Stefan Schwartz
2002 comedy films
2002 drama films
2000s English-language films
2000s British films